The Archaeological Museum Of Syros is located in Ermoupoli in Syros. It was established in 1889

History

The building

Other information

See also
www.culture.gr

References

Syros
Museums established in 1889
Buildings and structures in Syros
1889 establishments in Greece